Ascot, Ascott or Askot may refer to:

Places

Australia
 Ascot, Queensland, suburb of Brisbane
 Ascot, Queensland (Toowoomba Region), a locality
 Ascot Park, South Australia, suburb of Adelaide
 Ascot (Ballarat), town near Ballarat in Victoria
 Ascot (Bendigo), suburb of Bendigo in Victoria
 Ascot Vale, Victoria, suburb of Melbourne
 Electoral district of Ascot Vale, former electoral district of the Victorian Legislative Assembly
 Ascot, Western Australia, suburb of Perth
 Electoral district of Ascot, former electoral district of the Western Australia Legislative Assembly

Canada
 Mont-Bellevue, Quebec, which comprises the former town of Ascot
 Ascot Corner, Quebec

India
 Askot

New Zealand
 Ascot Park, New Zealand, suburb of Porirua

United Kingdom
 Ascot, Berkshire
 North Ascot
 South Ascot
 Ascott, Buckinghamshire
 Ascott House
 Ascott, Oxfordshire
 Ascott, Warwickshire
 Ascott-under-Wychwood, Oxfordshire
 Ascott d'Oyley, Oxfordshire
 Ascott Earl, Oxfordshire

Stadia and racing facilities
 Ascot Racecourse, a Berkshire, England horse racing facility
 Ascot Gold Cup, major race held at Ascot Racecourse
 Ascot Racecourse, Western Australia, a horse racing facility
 Ascot Stadium, a facility in Gweru, Zimbabwe
 Ascot Park (speedway), a motor racing track in Los Angeles
 Legion Ascot Speedway, a motor racing track in Los Angeles

Automobiles
 Ascot (1904 automobile)
 Ascot (1914 automobile)
 Ascot (1928 automobile)
 Honda Ascot

Motorcycles
 Honda Ascot, a 500cc motorcycle first produced in 1982

Clothing
 Ascot cap, a distinctive cap with a rounded shape
 Ascot tie, a type of cravat or scarf

Military
 Ascot-class minesweeper
 , one of the ships of this class

Other uses
 The Ascott Limited
 Ascot (finance)
 Ascott (surname)

Related terms
 Eastcote (disambiguation)
 Eastcott (disambiguation)